Manuel Köhler (born 25 April 1969 in Salzburg) is an Austrian slalom canoeist who competed from the mid-1980s to the early 2000s (decade). He won a bronze medal in the K1 team event at the 1996 European Championships in Augsburg.

Competing in three Summer Olympics, he earned his best finish of sixth in the K1 event in Sydney in 2000.

Since 2009 he participates in kayak expeditions. Some of his trips can be seen on his youtube channel https://www.youtube.com/channel/UC58JGpx0D-SgSjZ_N89hUEA/videos?view_as=subscriber

Currently working as sports and geography teacher on highschool BORG Monsberger in Graz, Austria.

World Cup individual podiums

References
Sports-Reference.com profile

1969 births
Austrian male canoeists
Canoeists at the 1992 Summer Olympics
Canoeists at the 1996 Summer Olympics
Canoeists at the 2000 Summer Olympics
Living people
Olympic canoeists of Austria